Zardaly is a village in Batken Region of Kyrgyzstan. It is part of the Batken District. It is a mountain village on the upper course of the river Sokh.

References 

Populated places in Batken Region